Mahim Assembly constituency is a part of Maharashtra Vidhan Sabha, in Western India; it is a segment of Mumbai South Central (Lok Sabha constituency).

Members of Vidhan Sabha

Election results

2019 Result

2014 result

2009 result

References

Assembly constituencies of Mumbai
Assembly constituencies of Maharashtra